Manuel "Manu" García Humanes (born 11 February 1991) is a Spanish footballer who plays for Gimnàstic de Tarragona as a goalkeeper.

Club career
Born in Pedrera, Seville, Andalusia, García represented CD Pedrera, Écija Balompié and UD Marinaleda as a youth. He made his senior debut with the latter team on 27 September 2009, coming on as a second-half substitute in a 7–1 Tercera División home routing of Recreativo de Huelva B.

In 2013 García joined Atarfe Industrial CF in the fourth division, after spells at Montilla CF and CD Pedrera in the regional leagues. He subsequently represented UD Maracena and CD El Ejido, achieving promotion to Segunda División B with the latter in 2016.

On 7 June 2017, García signed for fellow third division side Extremadura UD. He was an undisputed starter during the campaign, contributing with 36 league appearances as his side achieved a first-ever promotion to Segunda División.

García made his professional debut on 19 August 2018, starting in a 1–1 away draw against Real Oviedo. After starting the first matches of the campaign, he was overtaken by Álvaro Fernández and was subsequently loaned to SD Ponferradina in the third division on 28 December.

On 30 July 2019, after being a starter as Ponfe achieved promotion to division two, García signed a permanent contract with the club. He was one of the three goalkeepers used during the 2019–20 season, along with José Antonio Caro and René Román, and was a backup to Caro in 2020–21.

On 21 June 2021, García moved to Primera División RFEF side Gimnàstic de Tarragona on a one-year deal.

References

External links

1991 births
Living people
People from Sierra Sur (Seville)
Sportspeople from the Province of Seville
Spanish footballers
Footballers from Andalusia
Association football goalkeepers
Segunda División players
Segunda División B players
Tercera División players
Atarfe Industrial CF players
Extremadura UD footballers
SD Ponferradina players
Gimnàstic de Tarragona footballers